The 1975 Japanese Grand Prix was held at Fuji Speedway from 3 to 4 May 1975.

Touring car race

TS/GTS-A

Race classification

Pole position: Nobuhide Tachi, 1:34.97

TS/GTS-B

Race classification

Pole position: Yoshimi Katayama, 1:36.11

Formula car race

FL500

Race classification 

Pole position: Takashi Yamamoto, 1:45.54

All-Japan FJ1300 championship race

Race classification 

Pole position: Masahiro Hasemi, 1:34.66

All-Japan Formula 2000 championship race

Entry list

Classification

Qualifying classification

Race classification

Average speed of pole position driver: 178.1 km/h 
Average speed of winning driver: 174.4 km/h

References

External link
 Auto Sport No.170 1975 6-15 (in Japanese) All pages preview available.

Japanese Grand Prix
1975 Grand Prix
Japanese Grand Prix